John Page (dates unknown) was an English professional cricketer who played first-class cricket from 1819 to 1822.  He was mainly associated with Cambridge Town Club and made 5 known appearances in first-class matches.

References

External links

Bibliography
 Arthur Haygarth, Scores & Biographies, Volume 1 (1744–1826), Lillywhite, 1862

Date of birth unknown
Date of death unknown
English cricketers
English cricketers of 1787 to 1825
Cambridge Town Club cricketers